Jeremy Snyder is an American poet. He serves as poet laureate of Vallejo, California.

Background
Snyder was born in Vallejo, California, educated at the University of Montana, and served in the United States Navy.

Poetry
Jeremy Snyder began writing poetry at age 5.  Snyder hosts a poetry open mic, Poetry by the Bay, every Thursday night. Poetry by the Bay was founded in 2008 by Kyrah Ayers. Snyder became Vallejo’s poet laureate in January 2020 and serves until December 31, 2023. He was preceded in office by D.L. Lang and Dr. Genea Brice. In 2021 he performed at a virtual benefit for the Solano County Library Foundation and appeared on the Rooted in Poetry podcast. He also performed with his predecessors at Alibi Bookshop, and with fellow San Francisco bay area poets laureate in Richmond. His term  was extended through 2023 due to the COVID-19 pandemic disrupting the live events and poetry workshops he had planned. In 2022 like his predecessors he hosted the National Poetry Month celebration at the Solano County Library.

Publications

Snyder, Jeremy, "Dirt," Gnashing Teeth Publishing, April 10, 2021
Lang, D.L. ed., Verses, Voices, & Visions of Vallejo 2019.

See also 

 Genea Brice
 D.L. Lang
 List of municipal poets laureate in California

References

American male poets
Municipal Poets Laureate in the United States
Poets from California
Living people
21st-century American poets
Poets Laureate of Vallejo
Writers from Vallejo, California
University of Montana alumni
Year of birth missing (living people)
21st-century American male writers